The White Orchid is a 1954 American adventure film directed by Reginald Le Borg and written by Reginald Le Borg and David Duncan. The film stars William Lundigan, Peggie Castle, Armando Silvestre, Rosenda Monteros and Jorge Treviño. The film was released in November 1954, by United Artists.

Plot
Plot is too generous! An archeologist, Robert Burton, hears tell of a primitive, hidden Mexico civilization where little has changed in hundreds of years. He decides he's going to find it. A photographer sent to assist him on his original project is a women, Kathryn Williams. He's upset because she's a woman and fears that it will be too dangerous an expedition for a woman.

Together they go to a fiesta, where they seek out vanilla bean plantation owner Juan Cervantes for his knowledge of the forbidden city. He declines to help, not wishing to offend the natives there, but Kathryn pretends to be interested in Juan and he invites her to the plantation. Kathryn lies to Robert, telling him Juan has agreed to guide them to the hidden civilization. Here the story requires that the viewer have zero knowledge of Mexican geography, because the group now sets off on horse-back from the Zona Arqueológica El Tajín to Juan's vanilla plantation described as being in Chiapas, which is more than 200 km. Much of the time is oddly spent crossing a 'desert', which doesn't exist in this part of Mexico.

Lupita, the sweetheart of Juan, is jealous of his obvious interest in the photographer. She warns Juan that the woman will be the death of him. Juan nevertheless is talked into taking Kathryn and Robert where they wish to go. He demands that no weapon be taken, but Robert conceals a small gun and uses it to shoot a wild harmless tapir that was in the bushes that had startled Kathryn. Soon after one of the 'natives', a son of the chief, is accidentally killed by a knife set in a trap for securing food just as Kathryn takes his photo.

The 'native' believe the knife and camera together were responsible for the death and the three intruders are taken to the hidden village at spear point. Kathryn is to become a human sacrifice atop a great pyramid. Robert and Juan free themselves from their bonds and flee with Kathryn, and in the end, to distract the natives, Juan shoots off a gun, revealing his whereabouts. He sacrifices his own life so that the others can escape and Robert and Kathryn show little if any emotion.

The narrative is ridiculously simplistic - even for the 1950s - and reflects the dominant conservative attitudes of the time regarding women, non-Caucasians and 'primitive' people. Kathryn at first appears to be liberated, but secretly wants Robert and uses lies and feigns an interest in Juan to make Robert jealous and have Juan lead them to the hidden community. The 'natives' are racist generalized caricatures of 'primitives' and except for the pyramid could have been in any of the films depicting the so-called 'darkest' Africa or Latin America. When the intruders arrive the 'natives' perform a weird choreographed modern dance on the pyramid. And naturally, Juan sacrifices himself for the two gringos who by their arrogance and deceptions were responsible for his death. Despite all this the ending oddly enough appropriate since the arrival of the gringos Robert and Kathryn wreaks havoc on the 'mythic' indigenous community.

Cast 
William Lundigan as Robert Burton
Peggie Castle as Kathryn Williams
Armando Silvestre as Juan Cervantes
Rosenda Monteros as Lupita
Jorge Treviño as Arturo
Alejandro de Montenegro as Miguel
Miguel A. Gallardo as Pedro
Ramon S. Fernandez as Baytab
Ballet Moderno de Mexico as Native Dancers

References

External links 
 

1954 films
United Artists films
American adventure films
1954 adventure films
Films directed by Reginald Le Borg
Films shot in Mexico
Films with screenplays by David Duncan (writer)
1950s English-language films
1950s American films